The 2007 San Diego Padres season was the 39th season in franchise history. It began with the Padres' attempt to win a third consecutive NL West title.  After finishing the regular season with 89 wins and 73 losses, they were in a tie with the Colorado Rockies for both the NL wild card and second place in the NL West, they were defeated in a tie-breaker which placed them third overall in the division and out of playoff competition.

Offseason
November 8, 2006: Kevin Kouzmanoff was traded by the Cleveland Indians with Andrew Brown to the San Diego Padres for Josh Barfield.
December 20, 2006: Marcus Giles was signed as a free agent with the San Diego Padres.
January 3, 2007: Pete LaForest was signed as a free agent with the San Diego Padres.

Regular season

Season standings

National League West

Record vs. opponents

Roster

Player stats
Note: Team batting and pitching leaders are in bold.

Batting

Starters by position
Note: Pos = Position; G = Games played; AB = At bats; H = Hits; Avg. = Batting average; HR = Home runs; RBI = Runs batted in

Other batters
Note: G = Games played; AB = At bats; H = Hits; Avg. = Batting average; HR = Home runs; RBI = Runs batted in

Pitching

Starting pitchers
Note: G = Games pitched; IP = Innings pitched; W = Wins; L = Losses; ERA = Earned run average; SO = Strikeouts

Other pitchers
Note: G = Games pitched; IP = Innings pitched; W = Wins; L = Losses; ERA = Earned run average; SO = Strikeouts

Relief pitchers
Note: G = Games pitched; W = Wins; L = Losses; SV = Saves; ERA = Earned run average; SO = Strikeouts

Wild Card tie-breaker
The Padres ended tied with the Colorado Rockies for both second place in the NL West as well as the National League Wild Card.  A tie-breaker was played on October 1, 2007 in Denver to determine which team would continue on to post-season play.  The game lasted 13 innings through four hours and 40 minutes.  The Rockies won the Wild Card spot with a final score of 9 to 8, and the Padres' season was over.

Transactions
September 4, 2007: Pete LaForest was selected off waivers by the Philadelphia Phillies from the San Diego Padres.

Game log

|- style="background-color:#bbffbb"
| 1 || April 3 || @ Giants || 7 - 0 || Peavy (1-0) || Zito (0-1) || || 42,773 || 1-0
|- style="background-color:#bbffbb"
| 2 || April 4 || @ Giants || 5 - 3 || Meredith (1-0) || Hennessey (0-1) || Hoffman (1) || 39,938 || 2-0
|- style="background-color:#ffbbbb"
| 3 || April 5 || @ Giants || 5 - 3 || Morris (1-0) || Hensley (0-1)|| Benítez (1) || 37,914 || 2-1
|- style="background-color:#ffbbbb"
| 4 || April 6 || Rockies || 4 - 3 || Hirsh (1-0) || Maddux (0-1) || Fuentes (1) || 44,267 || 2-2
|- style="background-color:#bbffbb"
| 5 || April 7 || Rockies || 3 - 2 || Hoffman (1-0) || Corpas (0-1) || || 40,504 || 3-2
|- style="background-color:#bbffbb"
| 6 || April 8 || Rockies || 2 - 1  || Linebrink (1-0) || Hawkins (0-2) || || 27,086 || 4-2
|- style="background-color:#bbffbb"
| 7 || April 9 || Giants || 1 - 0 || Young (1-0) || Cain (0-1) || Hoffman (2) || 31,388 || 5-2
|- style="background-color:#ffbbbb"
| 8 || April 10 || Giants || 6 - 5 || Morris (2-0) || Hensley (0-2) || Benítez (2) || 28,878 || 5-3
|- style="background-color:#bbffbb"
| 9 || April 11 || Giants || 4 - 0 || Maddux (1-1) || Lowry (0-2) || || 31,568 || 6-3
|- style="background-color:#ffbbbb"
| 10 || April 13 || @ Dodgers || 9 - 1 || Lowe (2-1) || Wells (0-1) || || 49,090 || 6-4
|- style="background-color:#bbffbb"
| 11 || April 14 || @ Dodgers || 7 - 2 || Peavy (2-0) || Schmidt (1-2) || || 55,942 || 7-4
|- style="background-color:#ffbbbb"
| 12 || April 15 || @ Dodgers || 9 - 3 || Wolf (2-1) || Young (1-1) || || 55,298 || 7-5
|- style="background-color:#ffbbbb"
| 13 || April 16 || @ Cubs || 12 - 4 || Marquis (1-1) || Hensley (0-3) || || 32,126 || 7-6
|- style="background-color:#bbffbb"
| 14 || April 17 || @ Cubs || 4 - 3  || Brocail (1-0) || Ohman (0-1) || Hoffman (3) || 36,021 || 8-6
|- style="background-color:#ffbbbb"
| 15 || April 18 || D-backs || 5 - 2  || Peña (1-1) || Thompson (0-1) || Valverde (7) || 26,872 || 8-7
|- style="background-color:#bbffbb"
| 16 || April 19 || D-backs || 11 - 6 || Peavy (3-0) || Hernández (1-1) || || 32,224 || 9-7
|- style="background-color:#bbffbb"
| 17 || April 20 || @ Rockies || 11 - 1 || Young (2-1) || Fogg (0-1) || || 22,338 || 10-7
|- style="background-color:#bbffbb"
| 18 || April 21 || @ Rockies || 7 - 3 || Hensley (1-3) || Francis (1-2) || || 22,795 || 11-7
|- style="background-color:#ffbbbb"
| 19 || April 22 || @ Rockies || 4 - 2 || Hirsh (2-1) || Maddux (1-2) || Fuentes (4) || 25,746 || 11-8
|- style="background-color:#bbffbb"
| 20 || April 24 || @ D-backs || 10 - 5 || Wells (1-1) || Johnson (0-1) || Hoffman (4) || 19,508 || 12-8
|- style="background-color:#ffbbbb"
| 21 || April 25 || @ D-backs || 3 - 2 || Peña (2-1) || Hoffman (1-1) || || 18,307 || 12-9
|- style="background-color:#ffbbbb"
| 22 || April 26 || @ D-backs || 7 - 4 || Hernández (2-1) || Young (2-2) || Valverde (8) || 16,792 || 12-10
|- style="background-color:#ffbbbb"
| 23 || April 27 || Dodgers || 6 - 5 || Seánez (1-0) || Hoffman (1-2) || Saito (7) || 44,035 || 12-11
|- style="background-color:#bbffbb"
| 24 || April 28 || Dodgers || 3 - 2 || Maddux (2-2) || Tomko (0-2) || Hoffman (5) || 42,385 || 13-11
|- style="background-color:#ffbbbb"
| 25 || April 29 || Dodgers || 5 - 4  || Billingsley (1-0) || Hampson (0-1) || || 44,028 || 13-12
|- style="background-color:#ffbbbb"
| 26 || April 30 || Nationals || 3 - 2 || Patterson (1-4) || Peavy (3-1) || Cordero (4) || 19,769 || 13-13

|- style="background-color:#bbffbb"
| 27 || May 1 || Nationals || 3 - 0 || Young (3-2) || Hill (2-3) || Hoffman (6) || 19,438 || 14-13
|- style="background-color:#bbffbb"
| 28 || May 2 || Nationals || 7 - 3 || Brocail (2-0) || Chico (2-3) || || 22,153 || 15-13
|- style="background-color:#ffbbbb"
| 29 || May 4 || @ Marlins || 5 - 4 || Tankersley (1-0) || Linebrink (1-1) || Owens (4) || 24,691 || 15-14
|- style="background-color:#bbffbb"
| 30 || May 5 || @ Marlins || 7 - 6  || Hampson (1-1) || Gardner (0-2) || Hoffman (7) || 21,381 || 16-14
|- style="background-color:#bbffbb"
| 31 || May 6 || @ Marlins || 3 - 1 || Peavy (4-1) || Olsen (3-2) || Hoffman (8) || 15,310 || 17-14
|- style="background-color:#bbffbb"
| 32 || May 7 || @ Braves || 4 - 2 || Young (4-2) || James (3-3) || Hoffman (9) || 19,189 || 18-14
|- style="background-color:#ffbbbb"
| 33 || May 8 || @ Braves || 3 - 2 || González (2-0) || Bell (0-1) || Soriano (3) || 21,748 || 18-15
|- style="background-color:#ffbbbb"
| 34 || May 9 || @ Braves || 3 - 2 || Smoltz (5-1) || Meredith (1-1) || Soriano (4) || 36,523 || 18-16
|- style="background-color:#ffbbbb"
| 35 || May 10 || @ Braves || 5 - 3 || Hudson (4-1) || Wells (1-2) || Soriano (5) || 28,799 || 18-17
|- style="background-color:#bbffbb"
| 36 || May 11 || Cardinals || 7 - 0 || Peavy (5-1) || Wells (1-7) || || 38,901 || 19-17
|- style="background-color:#ffbbbb"
| 37 || May 12 || Cardinals || 5 - 0 || Looper (5-2) || Young (4-3) || || 44,082 || 19-18
|- style="background-color:#bbffbb"
| 38 || May 13 || Cardinals || 3 - 0 || Germano (1-0) || Reyes (0-6) || Hoffman (10) || 36,616 || 20-18
|- style="background-color:#bbffbb"
| 39 || May 14 || Reds || 7 - 1 || Maddux (3-2) || Belisle (3-3) || || 20,262 || 21-18
|- style="background-color:#ffbbbb"
| 40 || May 15 || Reds || 2 - 1  || Weathers (1-2) || Bell (0-2) || || 26,694 || 21-19
|- style="background-color:#bbffbb"
| 41 || May 16 || Reds || 3 - 2 || Hoffman (2-2) || Arroyo (2-4) || || 23,856 || 22-19
|- style="background-color:#bbffbb"
| 42 || May 18 || @ Mariners || 8 - 1 || Young (5-3) || Batista (3-4) || || 39,531 || 23-19
|- style="background-color:#ffbbbb"
| 43 || May 19 || @ Mariners || 7 - 4 || Ramírez (4-2) || Maddux (3-3) || Putz (10) || 34,287 || 23-20
|- style="background-color:#bbffbb"
| 44 || May 20 || @ Mariners || 2 - 1 || Germano (2-0) || Hernández (2-2) || Hoffman (11) || 38,844 || 24-20
|- style="background-color:#bbffbb"
| 45 || May 22 || Cubs || 5 - 1 || Peavy (6-1) || Hill (4-4) || Hoffman (12) || 26,192 || 25-20
|- style="background-color:#bbffbb"
| 46 || May 23 || Cubs || 2 - 1 || Wells (2-2) || Marshall (0-1) || Hoffman (13) || 27,535 || 26-20
|- style="background-color:#ffbbbb"
| 47 || May 24 || Cubs || 3 - 1 || Howry (2-3) || Meredith (1-2) || Dempster (10) || 32,258 || 26-21
|- style="background-color:#bbffbb"
| 48 || May 25 || Brewers || 8 - 6 || Maddux (4-3) || Bush (3-5) || Linebrink (1) || 32,130 || 27-21
|- style="background-color:#bbffbb"
| 49 || May 26 || Brewers || 6 - 3 || Germano (3-0) || Vargas (3-1) || Hoffman (14) || 35,975 || 28-21
|- style="background-color:#bbffbb"
| 50 || May 27 || Brewers || 3 - 0 || Peavy (7-1) || Suppan (6-5) || Hoffman (15) || 41,246 || 29-21
|- style="background-color:#ffbbbb"
| 51 || May 29 || @ Pirates || 4 - 1 || Gorzelanny (6-3) || Wells (2-3) || Torres (12) || 15,794 || 29-22
|- style="background-color:#bbffbb"
| 52 || May 30 || @ Pirates || 9 - 0 || Young (6-3) || Maholm (2-7) || || 12,734 || 30-22
|- style="background-color:#bbffbb"
| 53 || May 31 || @ Pirates || 4 - 2  || Meredith (3-2) || Sharpless (0-1) || Hoffman (16) || 14,966 || 31-22

|- style="background-color:#ffbbbb"
| 54 || June 1 || @ Nationals || 4 - 3  || Rauch (3-1) || Meredith (2-3) || || 22,354 || 31-23
|- style="background-color:#bbffbb"
| 55 || June 2 || @ Nationals || 11 - 3 || Germano (4-0) || Speigner (1-2) || || 21,635 || 32-23
|- style="background-color:#bbffbb"
| 56 || June 3 || @ Nationals || 7 - 3 || Wells (3-3) || Simontacchi (2-4) || || 26,967 || 33-23
|- style="background-color:#bbffbb"
| 57 || June 5 || Dodgers || 1 - 0 || Linebrink (2-1) || Seánez (2-1) || Hoffman (17) || 31,703 || 34-23
|- style="background-color:#bbffbb"
| 58 || June 6 || Dodgers || 5 - 2 || Maddux (5-3) || Wolf (7-4) || Hoffman (18) || 31,541 || 35-23
|- style="background-color:#bbffbb"
| 59 || June 7 || Dodgers || 6 - 5 || Hampson (2-1) || Broxton (2-2) || || 40,631 || 36-23
|- style="background-color:#ffbbbb"
| 60 || June 8 || Mariners || 6 - 5  || O'Flaherty (2-0) || Meredith (2-4) || Putz (16) || 44,325 || 36-24
|- style="background-color:#ffbbbb"
| 61 || June 9 || Mariners || 6 - 5 || Green (1-1) || Brocail (2-1) || Putz (17) || 37,178 || 36-25
|- style="background-color:#ffbbbb"
| 62 || June 10 || Mariners || 4 - 3 || Batista (7-4) || Hoffman (2-3) || Putz (18) || 35,950 || 36-26
|- style="background-color:#ffbbbb"
| 63 || June 12 || @ Devil Rays || 11 - 4 || Fossum (4-6) || Meredith (2-5)|| || 12,870 || 36-27
|- style="background-color:#bbffbb"
| 64 || June 13 || @ Devil Rays || 9 - 0 || Peavy (8-1) || Jackson (0-8) || || 12,020 || 37-27
|- style="background-color:#bbffbb"
| 65 || June 14 || @ Devil Rays || 7 - 1 || Germano (5-0) || Howell (1-1) || || 19,270 || 38-27
|- style="background-color:#ffbbbb"
| 66 || June 15 || @ Cubs || 4 - 1 || Lilly (5-4) || Wells (3-4) || Dempster (15) || 40,479 || 38-28
|- style="background-color:#bbffbb"
| 67 || June 16 || @ Cubs || 1 - 0 || Bell (1-2) || Zambrano (7-6) || Hoffman (19) || 41,632 || 39-28
|- style="background-color:#bbffbb"
| 68 || June 17 || @ Cubs || 11 - 3 || Maddux (6-4) || Hill (5-5) || || 40,964 || 40-28
|- style="background-color:#bbffbb"
| 69 || June 19 || Orioles || 12 - 6 || Peavy (9-1) || Trachsel (5-5) || || 38,181 || 41-28
|- style="background-color:#ffbbbb"
| 70 || June 20 || Orioles || 7 - 1 || Guthrie (4-1) || Germano (5-1) || || 26,931 || 41-29
|- style="background-color:#ffbbbb"
| 71 || June 21 || Orioles || 6 - 3 || Bédard (5-4) || Wells (3-5) || || 40,680 || 41-30
|- style="background-color:#ffbbbb"
| 72 || June 22 || Red Sox || 2 - 1 || Matsuzaka (9-5) || Maddux (6-4) || Papelbon (17) || 44,405 || 41-31
|- style="background-color:#bbffbb" 
| 73 || June 23 || Red Sox || 6 - 1 || Young (7-3) || Wakefield (7-8) || || 44,457 || 42-31
|- style="background-color:#ffbbbb"
| 74 || June 24 || Red Sox || 4 - 2 || Beckett (11-1) || Peavy (9-2) || Papelbon (18) || 44,449 || 42-32
|- style="background-color:#ffbbbb"
| 75 || June 25 || @ Giants || 4 - 3  || Chulk (3-2) || Hampson (2-2) || || 41,140 || 42-33
|- style="background-color:#bbffbb"
| 76 || June 26 || @ Giants || 3 - 2  || Meredith (3-5) || Messenger (1-2) || Hoffman (20) || 41,329 || 43-33
|- style="background-color:#bbffbb"
| 77 || June 27 || @ Giants || 4 - 2 || Maddux (7-4) || Cain (2-9) || Hoffman (21) || 42,527 || 44-33
|- style="background-color:#bbffbb"
| 78 || June 29 || @ Dodgers || 7 - 6 || Young (8-3) || Kuo (1-4) || Hoffman (22) || 52,050 || 45-33
|- style="background-color:#bbffbb"
| 79 || June 30 || @ Dodgers || 3 - 1  || Ring (1-0) || Tomko (1-6) || Hoffman (23) || 53,769 || 46-33

|- style="background-color:#ffbbbb"
| 80 || July 1 || @ Dodgers || 5 - 0 || Billingsley (5-0) || Germano (5-2) || || 48,632 || 46-34
|- style="background-color:#bbffbb"
| 81 || July 2 || Marlins || 3 - 1 || Wells (4-5) || Mitre (2-4) || Hoffman (24) || 25,857 || 47-34
|- style="background-color:#ffbbbb"
| 82 || July 3 || Marlins || 6 - 4 || Miller (3-0) || Maddux (7-5) || Gregg (16) || 34,488 || 47-35
|- style="background-color:#bbffbb"
| 83 || July 4 || Marlins || 1 - 0 || Bell (2-2) || Lindstrom (1-3) || || 27,491 || 48-35
|- style="background-color:#ffbbbb"
| 84 || July 5 || Marlins || 3 - 2 || Kim (4-4) || Peavy (9-3) || Gregg (17) || 32,496 || 48-36
|- style="background-color:#ffbbbb"
| 85 || July 6 || Braves || 7 - 4 || Carlyle (3-2) || Germano (5-3) || || 37,526 || 48-37
|- style="background-color:#bbffbb"
| 86 || July 7 || Braves || 8 - 5 || Bell (3-2) || Yates (2-1) || Hoffman (25) || 41,419 || 49-37
|- style="background-color:#ffbbbb"
| 87 || July 8 || Braves || 5 - 4 || Davies (4-7) || Maddux (7-6) || || 41,026 || 49-38
|- style="background-color:#ffbbbb"
| 88 || July 13 || @ D-backs || 8 - 3 || Davis (6-10) || Maddux (7-7) || || 30,981 || 49-39
|- style="background-color:#ffbbbb"
| 89 || July 14 || @ D-backs || 5 - 4 || Lyon (6-3) || Linebrink (2-2) || Valverde (27) || 36,833 || 49-40
|- style="background-color:#bbffbb"
| 90 || July 15 || @ D-backs || 4 - 0 || Germano (6-3) || Webb (8-7) || || 30,343 || 50-40
|- style="background-color:#bbffbb"
| 91 || July 16 || Mets || 5 - 1 || Wells (5-5) || Sosa (7-4) || || 35,802 || 51-40
|- style="background-color:#ffbbbb"
| 92 || July 17 || Mets || 7 - 0 || Hernández (6-4) || Peavy (9-4) || || 31,660 || 51-41
|- style="background-color:#bbffbb"
| 93 || July 18 || Mets || 5 - 4 || Linebrink (3-2) || Smith (2-1) || Hoffman (26) || 32,524 || 52-41
|- style="background-color:#bbffbb"
| 94 || July 19 || Phillies || 1 - 0 || Young (9-3) || Hamels (11-5) || Hoffman (27) || 30,885 || 53-41
|- style="background-color:#ffbbbb"
| 95 || July 20 || Phillies || 7 - 3 || Eaton (9-6) || Germano (6-4) || Alfonseca (7) || 36,113 || 53-42
|- style="background-color:#ffbbbb"
| 96 || July 21 || Phillies || 12 - 4 || Moyer (8-8) || Wells (5-6) || || 40,917 || 53-43
|- style="background-color:#ffbbbb"
| 97 || July 22 || Phillies || 9 - 0 || Durbin (2-2) || Peavy (9-5) || || 37,986 || 53-44
|- style="background-color:#ffbbbb"
| 98 || July 23 || @ Rockies || 7 - 5 || Buchholz (5-3) || Linebrink (3-3) || Corpas (5) || 31,047 || 53-45
|- style="background-color:#bbffbb"
| 99 || July 24 || @ Rockies || 5 - 3 || Bell (4-2) || Ramírez (2-2) || Hoffman (28) || 37,127 || 54-45
|- style="background-color:#ffbbbb"
| 100 || July 25 || @ Rockies || 10 - 2 || Cook (7-6) || Germano (6-5) || || 28,162 || 54-46
|- style="background-color:#ffbbbb"
| 101 || July 26 || @ Astros || 7 - 1 || Rodríguez (7-9) || Wells (5-7) || || 33,718 || 54-47
|- style="background-color:#bbffbb"
| 102 || July 27 || @ Astros || 9 - 4 || Peavy (10-5) || Williams (5-12) || || 39,996 || 55-47
|- style="background-color:#ffbbbb"
| 103 || July 28 || @ Astros || 3 - 1 || Oswalt (10-6) || Maddux (7-8) || Lidge (6) || 42,651 || 55-48
|- style="background-color:#bbffbb"
| 104 || July 29 || @ Astros || 18-11 || Brocail (3-1) || Jennings (2-7) || || 39,350 || 56-48
|- style="background-color:#ffbbbb"
| 105 || July 31 || D-backs || 4 - 0 || Webb (10-8) || Germano (6-6) || || 32,086 || 56-49

|- style="background-color:#ffbbbb"
| 106 || August 1 || D-backs || 9 - 5  || Valverde (1-3) || Bell (4-3) || || 30,416 || 56-50
|- style="background-color:#bbffbb"
| 107 || August 2 || D-backs || 11 - 0 || Peavy (11-5) || Petit (2-3) || || 37,119 || 57-50
|- style="background-color:#bbffbb"
| 108 || August 3 || Giants || 4 - 3  || Bell (5-3) || Taschner (2-1) || || 43,523 || 58-50
|- style="background-color:#bbffbb"
| 109 || August 4 || Giants || 3 - 2  || Meredith (4-5) || Messenger (1-4) || || 42,497 || 59-50
|- style="background-color:#bbffbb"
| 110 || August 5 || Giants || 5 - 4 || Brocail (4-1) || Chulk (4-3) || Hoffman (29) || 42,438 || 60-50
|- style="background-color:#ffbbbb"
| 111 || August 6 || @ Cardinals || 10 - 5 ||Looper (9-9) ||Wells (5-8) || || 42,743 || 60-51
|- style="background-color:#bbffbb"
| 112 || August 7 || @ Cardinals || 4 - 0 || Peavy (12-5) ||Reyes (1-11) || || 42,846 || 61-51
|- style="background-color:#ffbbbb"
| 113 || August 8 || @ Cardinals || 2 - 1 || Wells (5-13) || Maddux (7-9) || Isringhausen (22) || 42,138 || 61-52
|- style="background-color:#ffbbbb"
| 114 || August 9 || @ Cardinals || 5 - 0 || Piñeiro (2-2) || Young (9-4) || || 42,848 || 61-53
|- style="background-color:#bbffbb"
| 115 || August 10 || @ Reds || 12 - 7  || Cameron (1-0) || Weathers (2-4) || || 21,594 || 62-53
|- style="background-color:#ffbbbb"
| 116 || August 11 || @ Reds || 8 - 3 || Livingston (3-2) || Hampson (2-3) || || 27,381 || 62-54
|- style="background-color:#bbffbb"
| 117 || August 12 || @ Reds || 10 - 4 || Peavy (13-5) || Arroyo (5-13) || || 31,297 || 63-54
|- style="background-color:#bbffbb"
| 118 || August 14 || Rockies || 8 - 0 || Maddux (8-9) || Francis (13-6) || || 32,049 || 64-54
|- style="background-color:#ffbbbb"
| 119 || August 15 || Rockies || 3 - 0 || Jiménez (2-2) || Meredith (4-6) || Corpas (10) || 36,864 || 64-55
|- style="background-color:#bbffbb"
| 120 || August 16 || Rockies || 11 - 9 || Hensley (2-3) || Affeldt (4-3) || Hoffman (30) || 28,198 || 65-55
|- style="background-color:#ffbbbb"
| 121 || August 17 || Astros || 3 - 1 || Williams (7-12) || Bell (5-4) || Lidge (10) || 32,063 || 65-56
|- style="background-color:#ffbbbb"
| 122 || August 18 || Astros || 3 - 2 || Borkowski (3-3) || Germano (6-7) || Lidge (11) || 44,272 || 65-57
|- style="background-color:#bbffbb"
| 123 || August 19 || Astros || 5 - 3 || Maddux (9-9) || Albers (3-6) || Hoffman (31) || 37,628 || 66-57
|- style="background-color:#ffbbbb"
| 124 || August 21 || @ Mets || 7 - 6 || Wagner (2-1) || Hoffman (2-4) || || 48,592 || 66-58
|- style="background-color:#bbffbb"
| 125 || August 22 || @ Mets || 7 - 5 || Peavy (14-5) || Lawrence (1-1) || Hoffman (32) || 50,060 || 67-58
|- style="background-color:#bbffbb"
| 126 || August 23 || @ Mets || 9 - 8  || Hoffman (3-4) || Heilman (7-6) || Bell (1) || 50,078 || 68-58
|- style="background-color:#bbffbb"
| 127 || August 24 || @ Phillies || 14 - 3 || Maddux (10-9) || Moyer (11-10) || || 39,023 || 69-58
|- style="background-color:#bbffbb"
| 128 || August 25 || @ Phillies || 4 - 3 || Bell (6-4) || Myers (2-5) || Hoffman (33) || 37,957 || 70-58
|- style="background-color:#ffbbbb"
| 129 || August 26 || @ Phillies || 14 - 2 || Kendrick (7-3) || Stauffer (0-1) || Ennis (1) || 39,362 || 70-59
|- style="background-color:#bbffbb"
| 130 || August 27 || D-backs || 3 - 1 || Peavy (15-5) || Hernández (9-9) || Hoffman (34) || 25,763 || 71-59
|- style="background-color:#bbffbb"
| 131 || August 28 || D-backs || 6 - 4 || Germano (7-7) || Webb (14-9) || Hoffman (35) || 23,006 || 72-59
|- style="background-color:#bbffbb"
| 132 || August 29 || D-backs || 3 - 1 || Cameron (2-0) || Slaten (3-2) || Bell (2) || 29,021 || 73-59
|- style="background-color:#ffbbbb"
| 133 || August 30 || D-backs || 8 - 7 || Davis (12-11) || Young (9-5) || Valverde (41) || 28,554 || 73-60
|- style="background-color:#bbffbb"
| 134 || August 31 || Dodgers || 6 - 4 || Brocail (5-1) || Seánez (6-3) || Hoffman (36) || 44,324 || 74-60

|- style="background-color:#bbffbb"
| 135 || September 1 || Dodgers || 7 - 0 || Peavy (16-5) || Lowe (11-12) || || 42,605 || 75-60
|- style="background-color:#ffbbbb"
| 136 || September 2 || Dodgers || 5 - 0 || Billingsley (10-4) || Germano (7-8) || || 40,776 || 75-61
|- style="background-color:#bbffbb"
| 137 || September 3 || @ D-backs || 10 - 2 || Maddux (11-9) || Owings (6-8) || || 30,531 || 76-61
|- style="background-color:#ffbbbb"
| 138 || September 4 || @ D-backs || 9 - 1 || Davis (13-11) || Young (9-6) || || 26,063 || 76-62
|- style="background-color:#ffbbbb"
| 139 || September 5 || @ D-backs || 9 - 6 || Hernández (10-9) || Peavy (16-6) || Valverde (42) || 28,065 || 76-63
|- style="background-color:#ffbbbb"
| 140 || September 7 || @ Rockies || 10 - 4 || Herges (4-0) || Germano (7-9) || || 27,247 || 76-64
|- style="background-color:#bbffbb"
| 141 || September 8 || @ Rockies || 3 - 1 || Maddux (12-9) || Francis (15-7) || Hoffman (37) || 30,429 || 77-64
|- style="background-color:#ffbbbb"
| 142 || September 9 || @ Rockies || 4 - 2 || Fogg (9-9) || Young (9-7) || Corpas (14) || 20,260 || 77-65
|- style="background-color:#bbffbb"
| 143 || September 11 || @ Dodgers || 9 - 4 || Peavy (17-6) || Loaiza (2-1) || || 51,620 || 78-65
|- style="background-color:#ffbbbb"
| 144 || September 12 || @ Dodgers || 6 - 1 || Billingsley (11-4) || Germano (7-10) || || 43,699 || 78-66
|- style="background-color:#ffbbbb"
| 145 || September 13 || @ Dodgers || 6 - 3 || Wells (8-8) || Maddux (12-10) || Saito (38) || 44,496 || 78-67
|- style="background-color:#bbffbb"
| 146 || September 14 || Giants || 5 - 4  || Hoffman (4-4) || Giese (0-1) || || 32,053 || 79-67
|- style="background-color:#bbffbb"
| 147 || September 15 || Giants || 6 - 0 || Tomko (3-11) || Cain (7-15) || || 41,554 || 80-67
|- style="background-color:#bbffbb"
| 148 || September 16 || Giants || 5 - 1 || Peavy (18-6) || Lincecum (7-5) || || 34,000 || 81-67
|- style="background-color:#bbffbb"
| 149 || September 17 || Pirates || 3 - 0 || Cassel (1-0) || Van Benschoten (0-6) || Hoffman (38) || 33,557 || 82-67
|- style="background-color:#bbffbb"
| 150 || September 18 || Pirates || 5 - 3 || Maddux (13-10) || Gorzelanny (14-8) || Hoffman (39) || 30,629 || 83-67
|- style="background-color:#bbffbb"
| 151 || September 19 || Pirates || 5 - 3 || Meredith (5-6) || Capps (4-7) || || 26,354 || 84-67
|- style="background-color:#bbffbb"
| 152 || September 20 || Pirates || 6 - 3 || Tomko (4-11) || Morris (9-11) || Hoffman (40) || 27,020 || 85-67
|- style="background-color:#ffbbbb"
| 153 || September 21 || Rockies || 2 - 1  || Herges (5-1) || Thatcher (0-1) || || 31,288 || 85-68
|- style="background-color:#ffbbbb"
| 154 || September 22 || Rockies || 6 - 2 || Speier (2-1) || Cassel (1-1) || || 35,020 || 85-69
|- style="background-color:#ffbbbb"
| 155 || September 23 || Rockies || 7 - 3 || Francis (17-8) || Maddux (13-11) || || 37,984 || 85-70
|- style="background-color:#ffbbbb"
| 156 || September 24 || @ Giants || 9 - 4 || Zito (10-13) || Young (9-8) || || 35,650 || 85-71
|- style="background-color:#bbffbb"
| 157 || September 25 || @ Giants || 6 - 4 || Thatcher (1-1) || Wilson (1-2) || Hoffman (41) || 35,524 || 86-71
|- style="background-color:#bbffbb"
| 158 || September 26 || @ Giants || 11 - 3 || Peavy (19-6) || Misch (0-4) || || 42,926 || 87-71
|- style="background-color:#bbffbb"
| 159 || September 27 || @ Brewers || 9 - 5 || Thatcher (2-1) || Gallardo (9-5) || || 34,918 || 88-71
|- style="background-color:#bbffbb"
| 160 || September 28 || @ Brewers || 6 - 3 || Maddux (14-11) || Vargas (11-6) || Hoffman (42) || 38,135 || 89-71
|- style="background-color:#ffbbbb"
| 161 || September 29 || @ Brewers || 4 - 3  || Stetter (1-0) || Thatcher (2-2) || || 40,946 || 89-72
|- style="background-color:#ffbbbb"
| 162 || September 30 || @ Brewers || 11 - 6 || Suppan (12-12) || Tomko (4-12) || || 42,415 || 89-73

|- style="background-color:#ffbbbb"
| 163 || October 1 || @ Rockies || 9 - 8  || Ortiz (5-4) || Hoffman (4-5) || || 48,404 || 89-74

Farm system 

LEAGUE CHAMPIONS: San Antonio

References

External links
San Diego Padres batting statistics on ESPN.com
San Diego Padres pitching statistics on ESPN.com
2007 San Diego Padres at Baseball Reference

San Diego Padres seasons
San Diego Padres season
San Diego